Steve Phillips (born 1963) is a baseball analyst and former general manager of the New York Mets.

Steve Phillips may also refer to:

Steve Phillips (writer), bestselling author, founder of Democracy in Color
Steve Phillips (musician) (born 1948), English blues and country musician who played with the Notting Hillbillies
Steve Phillips (footballer, born 1954), English football forward with a number of clubs in the 1970s and 1980s
Steve Phillips (footballer, born 1978), English football goalkeeper with Bristol City and Bristol Rovers in the 1990s and 2000s
Steve Phillips (outfielder) (born 1968), American minor league baseball player, instructor and manager
Steven Randy Phillips, better known as Randy Phillips (born 1990), used social media to reveal his homosexuality while serving in the U.S. military
Steve Phillips (long jumper) (born 1972), British long jumper
Steve Phillips, chief executive officer, Welsh Rugby Union

See also
Stephen Phillips (disambiguation)